Duke Chu of Jin was from 474 to 452 BC the ruler of the State of Jin, a major power during the Spring and Autumn period of ancient China. His ancestral name was Ji, given name Zao, and Duke Chu was his posthumous title.  He succeeded his father, Duke Ding of Jin, who died in 475 BC.  He was in effect the last ruler of Jin, as at the end of his reign Jin would be partitioned into the new states of Han, Zhao, and Wei, although the title of the Duke of Jin would still exist in name only for several more generations.

Rise of the Zhi clan
The state of Jin had long been dominated by aristocratic clans.  During the reign of Duke Chu's father Duke Ding, the six major clans fought a civil war, and in 490 BC the Fan and Zhonghang clans were defeated.  In 458 BC, the remaining four clans – Zhi, Han, Zhao, and Wei – divided up the former territory of Fan and Zhonghang amongst themselves, and the Zhi clan, under the leadership of Zhi Yao (知瑤), became the most powerful of the four.  Zhi even invaded the state of Zhongshan, annexing Qiongyu (in present-day Yi County, Hebei).

Partition of Jin

In 455 BC, Zhi Yao demanded that the three other clans cede territory to the Zhi clan.  The Han and Wei clans complied, but Zhao Xiangzi, the leader of the Zhao clan, refused.  To punish his defiance, Zhi Yao led the forces of Zhi, Han, and Wei to attack Zhao, besieging the Zhao capital Jinyang.  After enduring two years of siege, Zhao Xiangzi secretly sent an envoy to negotiate with Han and Wei, persuading them to switch sides.  In 453 BC, Zhao, Han, and Wei launched a coordinated counterattack, defeating the Zhi force and killing Zhi Yao.  After annihilating the Zhi clan, they divided the territory of Zhi among themselves.  The three clans had by this time become separate states while the Duke of Jin was reduced to a mere figurehead.  This was a watershed event in Chinese history that is often considered the start of the Warring States period.

The following year, Duke Chu of Jin fled to the State of Chu.  Zhao, Han, and Wei, now effectively in control of Jin, installed Jiao, a great-grandson of Duke Zhao of Jin, as the titular ruler of Jin.  Jiao was later known as Duke Jing of Jin.

References

Monarchs of Jin (Chinese state)
5th-century BC Chinese monarchs